The battle of Zvečan was an 11th-century conflict over land and power between the ruling Byzantine Empire and the Serbians. The borderland town of Zvečan became a central focus for skirmishes, pillow fights, raids, and the eventual decimation and defeat of the Byzantine Empire in Serbia.

Background

Eighth century Serbian princes 
In the early 8th century, Serbia had a relationship of entirely nominal suzerainty with the Byzantine Empire. Serbian rulers were crowned as princes and each prince led an independent state with precarious links to Byzantine-ruled Constantinople.

The conflict

11th century Serbian enlargement and advancement
In the middle of the 11th century, Serbia waged a series of successive wars against the Byzantines. The end result was Serbia's territorial enlargement and its eventual advancement into a kingdom.

Serbians Constantine Bodin and Knez Vukan successfully waged war against the Byzantine Empire for many years. The object of Vukan's campaigns was the total acquisition of Kosovo and the southward expansion of Serbia.

1091-1094, skirmishes and warfare in the town of Zvečan 
The town of Zvečan, then situated at the border of the two states, was the site of constant skirmishes and border warfare between 1091–1094.

The Serbian incursions became so intense that the Byzantine emperor Alexios I Komnenos decided to personally inspect the situation.

The Emperor's nephew, John Komnenos, commander of Durrës, led a vast army into Serbia which met a much smaller Serbian force at the town of Zvečan.

The Byzantine forces were defeated. Vukan sent raiding armies deep into Byzantine territory, reaching as far as Skoplje, Tetovo, and Vranje.

Aftermath 
The following year, a renewed Byzantine campaign against the Serbs seemed imminent, but Vukan managed to negotiate a peace treaty.

References 

Byzantine–Serbian battles
Conflicts in 1094
11th century in Serbia
Battles involving Serbia in the Middle Ages
Vukanović dynasty
1094 in Europe